

Friedrich Sixt (28 October 1895  – 4 August 1976) was a German general during World War II who commanded several divisions.  He was a recipient of the  Knight's Cross of the Iron Cross with Oak Leaves of Nazi Germany.

Awards and decorations
 Iron Cross (1914) 2nd Class (23 December 1915) & 1st Class (5 May 1918)
 Clasp to the Iron Cross (1939)  2nd Class (28 September 1939) & 1st Class  (11 June 1941)
 German Cross in Gold on 18 May 1942 as Oberst im Generalstab in the General Staff of the XXXXIV Armeekorps
 Knight's Cross of the Iron Cross with Oak Leaves
 Knight's Cross on 17 December 1943 as Generalleutnant and commander of 50. Infanterie-Division
 Oak Leaves on 11 March 1945 as Generalleutnant and commander of 5. Jäger-Division

References

Citations

Bibliography

 
 
 

1895 births
1976 deaths
Lieutenant generals of the German Army (Wehrmacht)
German Army personnel of World War I
Military personnel from Munich
Recipients of the clasp to the Iron Cross, 1st class
Recipients of the Gold German Cross
Recipients of the Knight's Cross of the Iron Cross with Oak Leaves
German prisoners of war in World War II held by the United Kingdom
People from the Kingdom of Bavaria
20th-century Freikorps personnel
German Army generals of World War II